Philip Matthew Horner (born 10 November 1966, in Leeds, West Yorkshire) is a former professional footballer. He is now a qualified physiotherapist and works at his former playing club Blackpool.

Career
Horner began his career with Leicester City in 1983, but he only made ten league appearances in five years at Filbert Street and spent a short spell on loan at Rotherham United in the 1985–86 season.

In 1988, he joined Halifax Town, then managed by Billy Ayre. Horner followed Ayre to Blackpool when the latter became manager of the Tangerines in 1990. In six years at Bloomfield Road he made 187 league appearances, scoring 22 goals.

He joined non-League Southport on loan in the 1995–96 season. After finishing his professional playing career at Bloomfield Road, Horner returned to Southport on a permanent basis while he studied for a Bachelor of Science degree in physiotherapy. He finished his playing career with Lancaster City in the 1999–2000 season in the Northern Premier League Premier Division.

Post-football career
After gaining his degree in Physiotherapy from the University of Salford, Horner worked as a physiotherapist at Royal Preston Hospital before returning to Bloomfield Road to become Blackpool's club physiotherapist in November 2000, a role he continues to fulfill. Horner is a member of both the Chartered Society of Physiotherapy and the Council of Professional Supplementary Medicine.

Honours

Blackpool
Division Four play-off winner: 1991–92

Southport
FA Trophy runner-up: 1997–98

References

External links

Blackpool career profile

1966 births
Living people
Footballers from Leeds
English footballers
Leicester City F.C. players
Rotherham United F.C. players
Halifax Town A.F.C. players
Blackpool F.C. players
Southport F.C. players
Lancaster City F.C. players
Blackpool F.C. non-playing staff
Association football physiotherapists
Association football defenders